Fujiwara no Saneko (藤原（洞院）佶子; 1245 – 2 September 1272) als known as Kyogoku-in (京極院), was Empress of Japan as the consort of Emperor Kameyama.

Issue:

First daughter: Imperial Princess Kenshi (晛子内親王)
First son: Imperial Prince Tomohito (知仁親王)
Second son: Imperial Prince Yohito (世仁親王) (Emperor Go-Uda)

Notes

Fujiwara clan
Japanese empresses
1245 births
1272 deaths